Route 325 is a Quebec provincial highway located in the Montérégie region near the Ontario-Quebec border. The 43-kilometer highway runs from south to north from Rivière-Beaudette at the junction of Route 338 (just south of Autoroute 20) to Rigaud at the junction of Route 342.

Municipalities along Route 325
 Rivière-Beaudette
 Saint-Télesphore
 Sainte-Justine-de-Newton
 Très-Saint-Rédempteur
 Rigaud

Major intersections

See also
 List of Quebec provincial highways

References

External links
 Official Transport Quebec Road Map 
Route 325 on Google Maps

325